Maurits Van Hoeck (30 September 1890 – 1 August 1950) was a Belgian poet, writer, composer, translator and critic.

He was born in 1890 in Hoogstraten, Belgium. He was a Roman Catholic priest and writer. Van Hoeck died in Antwerp in 1950.

References

External links 
 Maurits van Hoeck at the Digital Library for Dutch Literature

1890 births
1950 deaths
20th-century Belgian writers
20th-century Belgian poets
People from Hoogstraten